Trần Minh Quang is a former Vietnamese goalkeeper. He is currently the first coach assistant of Bình Dương .

International statistics

Caps and goals by year

Honours

Club
Bình Dương F.C.
V-League: 2008
Vietnamese Super Cup: 2008

Individual
Vietnamese Silver Ball: 2002

References

1973 births
Living people
Vietnamese footballers
Vietnam international footballers
People from Bình Định province
Southeast Asian Games silver medalists for Vietnam
Southeast Asian Games medalists in football
Association football goalkeepers
Competitors at the 1999 Southeast Asian Games
Binh Dinh FC players
Becamex Binh Duong FC players
V.League 1 players